Snellius may refer to:

Rudolph Snellius (1546-1613), Dutch linguist and mathematician at the Universities of Marburg and Leiden
Willebrord Snellius (1580-1626), Dutch astronomer and mathematician, most famous for the law of refraction now known as Snell's law
Snellius (crater), a lunar crater located near the southeast limb of the Moon
Vallis Snellius, a linear valley on the near side of the Moon